Al Majaridah is one of the governorates in 'Asir Region, Saudi Arabia.

References 

Populated places in 'Asir Province
Governorates of Saudi Arabia